Underwater wrestling may refer to:

 Aquathlon (underwater wrestling)
 Suijutsu